Zillur Rahman is a professor of management studies at the Indian Institute of Technology Roorkee in Roorkee, Uttarakhand, India.

Prof.Rahman holds a MSc in Mathematics, MBA and Ph.D in Business administration , all from Aligarh Muslim University He is a Senior Professor in the  IIT Roorkee, 

He has published research papers in reputed international papers including the Journal of Service Marketing, International Journal of Contemporary Hospitality Management, Journal of Cleaner Production, Telematics and Informatics, among others.  

Prof. Rahman is the recipient of Highly Commended Paper in Emerald Literati Network Awards for Excellence, 2016. Prof. Rahman is also the recipient of the Commendable Faculty Award in the domain Business, Management and Accounting, 2018. He has listed in the top three Management researcher in India in the Research.com's 2022 Top Business and Management Scientists in India 

He was the Head of the Department from 2016 to 2019 at DoMS IIT Roorkee.

He has delivered research talk in many countries including USA, Switzerland, Germany, France, Italy and Turkey. 

His primary research interests are in areas of Marketing, Strategic management, Services marketing and Consumer behaviour.

Publications

Books
 Consumer Behavior, now in its 10th ed. , used as a text book in consumer behavior courses in Indian Business schools.
 David A. Aaker, Christine Moorman, Jamidul Islam, Zillur Rahman, Strategic Market Management, 11ed, Wiley India Pvt Ltd, 2021, ISBN Code: 978-9354243387.
 GC Beri , Arun Kaushik , Zillur Rahman, Marketing Research, 6e, McGraw Hill, 2020, ISBN Code: 978-9390177530.

Most Cited Journal Articles
Joshi Y, Rahman Z. Factors affecting green purchase behaviour and future research directions. International Strategic management review. 2015 Jun 1;3(1-2):128-43. (Cited 826 times, according to Google Scholar  ) 
Goyal P, Rahman Z, Kazmi AA. Corporate sustainability performance and firm performance research: Literature review and future research agenda. Management Decision. 2013 Mar 1. (Cited 364 times, according to Google Scholar. )

Talib F, Rahman Z, Qureshi MN. Analysis of interaction among the barriers to total quality management implementation using interpretive structural modeling approach. Benchmarking: An International Journal. 2011 Jul 12. (Cited 338 times, according to Google Scholar. )  
Talib F, Rahman Z, Qureshi MN. An empirical investigation of relationship between total quality management practices and quality performance in Indian service companies. International journal of quality & reliability management. 2013 Mar 8. (Cited 297 times, according to Google Scholar. )  
Kumar V, Rahman Z, Kazmi AA, Goyal P. Evolution of sustainability as marketing strategy: Beginning of new era. Procedia-Social and Behavioral Sciences. 2012 Jan 1;37:482-9. (Cited 187 times, according to Google Scholar. )  
Islam JU, Hollebeek LD, Rahman Z, Khan I, Rasool A. Customer engagement in the service context: an empirical investigation of the construct, its antecedents and consequences.  'Journal of Retailing and Consumer Services ''. 2019 Sep 1;50:277-85.. (Cited 105 times, according to Google Scholar. )

References

External links 

 

Year of birth missing (living people)
Living people